The 2019 Queensland Basketball League season was the 34th and last season of competition since its establishment in 1979. A total of 30 teams contested the league. The regular season was played between 6 April and 3 August 2019, and the schedule was announced on 22 February 2019.

Ladder

Ladder Progression 

 Numbers highlighted in green indicate that the team finished the round inside the top eight.
 Numbers highlighted in blue indicates the team finished first on the ladder in that round.
 Numbers highlighted in red indicates the team finished last place on the ladder in that round.

Game log

Round 1

Round 2

Round 3

Round 4

Round 5

Round 6

Round 7

Round 8

Round 9

Round 10

Round 11

Round 12

Round 13

Round 14

Round 15

References 

Queensland Basketball League seasons
2019 in Australian basketball